Lesnoy is a rural locality (a village) in Milovsky Selsoviet, Ufimsky District, Bashkortostan, Russia. The population was 15 as of 2010. There are 4 streets.

Geography 
Lesnoy is located 28 km west of Ufa (the district's administrative centre) by road. Sergeyevka is the nearest rural locality.

References 

Rural localities in Ufimsky District